"All We Need Is Love" is a 2014 song by Australian singer Ricki-Lee Coulter.

All We Need Is Love may also refer to:
All We Need Is Love (album), an album by Stefanie Heinzmann
"All We Need Is Love", a 2000 single by Landsholdet, the Denmark national football team
"All We Need Is Love", a song by Ric Ocasek from the 1991 album Fireball Zone
"All We Need Is Love", a song by Elizabeth Cook from the album This Side of the Moon
"All We Need Is Love", a song by the Leningrad Cowboys from the 2011 album Buena Vodka Social Club
"All We Need Is Love (Christmas in the Yard)", a song by The Big Yard Family featuring Shaggy from Now That's What I Call Christmas!
"All We Need Is Love", a 1977 single by Kelly Marie